Heavyweights is  the debut album led by saxophonist Sal Nistico which was recorded in 1961 and released on the Jazzland label.

Reception

The AllMusic review by Scott Yanow stated, "the recorded debut of tenor saxophonist Sal Nistico as a leader is quite impressive" noting that Nistico "really romps through most of the seven tunes" and "Adderley is also heard in prime form on the superior bop date".

Track listing

Personnel
Sal Nistico – tenor saxophone
Nat Adderley – cornet (tracks 1, 2 & 4-7)
Barry Harris – piano
Sam Jones – bass
Walter Perkins – drums

References

Sal Nistico albums
1962 albums
Riverside Records albums
Albums produced by Orrin Keepnews